Road Rules: Europe is the third season of the MTV reality television series Road Rules. It took place exclusively on the continent of Europe, the first time the series ever ventured outside the United States. This was also the only cast in Road Rules history in which non-American citizens outnumbered American citizens. It premiered on MTV on January 6, 1997 and concluded its run on March 31, 1997.

Cast

Tasks list

Episodes

After filming
In 2002, Michelle Parma died in a car accident along with her cousin.

The Challenge

Challenge in bold indicates that the contestant was a finalist on the Challenge.

References

External links

Road Rules
1997 American television seasons
Television shows filmed in France
Television shows filmed in Italy
Television shows filmed in the Netherlands
Television shows filmed in Spain